John Murray (1768 – March 7, 1834) was a member of the United States House of Representatives from Pennsylvania.

John Murray was born near Pott's Grove, Pennsylvania. He was a member of the Pennsylvania House of Representatives from 1807 to 1810. Murray was elected as a Republican to the Fifteenth Congress to fill the vacancy caused by the resignation of David Scott. He was reelected to the Sixteenth Congress.

He died in East Chillisquaque Township, Pennsylvania and was interred in Chillisquaque Cemetery, near Potts Grove.

He was a cousin of Thomas Murray, Jr. (1779-1823), who also served as a Congressman from Pennsylvania.

Sources

The Political Graveyard

Members of the Pennsylvania House of Representatives
1768 births
1834 deaths
Democratic-Republican Party members of the United States House of Representatives from Pennsylvania